This article lists the members of the Presidency of Yugoslavia, the collective head of state of the Socialist Federal Republic of Yugoslavia from 1971 until the country's dissolution in 1991/92.

Formed by the 1971 amendments to the 1963 Yugoslav Constitution, the Presidency of Yugoslavia originally had 23 members – three from each republic, two from each autonomous province and President of the Republic Josip Broz Tito. The 1974 Yugoslav Constitution reorganized the Presidency, reducing it to 9 members – one from each republic and autonomous province and, until 1988, President of the League of Communists of Yugoslavia ex officio. The 1974 Constitution provided for the office of President of the Presidency, but only coming into effect with the disestablishment of the office of President of the Republic. A separate article affirmed Josip Broz Tito with an unlimited mandate which ensured the new President of the Presidency would not come into effect until after his death, which occurred on 4 May 1980.

List

SR Bosnia and Herzegovina members

SR Croatia members

SR Serbia members

SR Slovenia members

SR Macedonia members

SR Montenegro members

SAP Vojvodina members

SAP Kosovo members

Presidents of the LCY (ex officio)

See also
President of the Presidency of Yugoslavia
Vice President of the Presidency of Yugoslavia

References

Socialist Federal Republic of Yugoslavia
Politics of Yugoslavia
Presidency